Ağköynək (also, Agkeynak and Ağ Köynək) is a village and municipality in the Qazakh Rayon of Azerbaijan.  It has a population of 3,272.

Notable natives 

 Shamoy Chobanov — National Hero of Azerbaijan.

References 
Notes

Sources

Populated places in Qazax District